South Acton railway station is in the London Borough of Ealing in South Acton. It is on the North London line, and the station and all trains serving it are operated by London Overground. It is in Travelcard Zone 3. Until 1959 it was also served by the District line of the London Underground.

History
South Acton station was opened on 1 January 1880 by the North & South Western Junction Railway for North London Line trains on the London Broad Street – Richmond line. There was a connecting branch line at South Acton to Hammersmith, renamed Hammersmith and Chiswick from 1 July 1880 and closed from 1 January 1917. There was another branch in the opposite direction from 13 June 1905 to Acton Town, a District Railway service that was withdrawn from 2 March 1959.

Branch line from Acton Town

Construction
A short spur of the District Railway from Acton Town, 1,232 yards (1,126 metres) long, was authorised by the Metropolitan Railway Act of 1874. When first opened, the spur was used for goods trains from 15 May 1899 onwards. Passenger services were introduced on 13 June 1905 to provide an interchange with the North London Railway which ran services from north London to the District Railway's Richmond branch. It thus provided an easier interchange for Richmond for eastbound passengers than changing trains at Turnham Green further east.

Operations
The South Acton station on the District line of the London Underground was located adjacent to South Acton station on the North London line on the north-west side of the tracks.

Initially, the line had through passenger services to Hounslow Barracks (now Hounslow West). However, the line was relatively little used and in 1932 the line was reduced to a single track, operated by a one-car shuttle service between Acton Town and South Acton.

In 1933 the railway became part of the London Passenger Transport Board, becoming a branch line of the District line.

Just south of the station before the Bollo Lane level crossing was located a major creamery and milk bottling plant for Express Dairies, which was served by milk trains from both the Great Western Railway and the Southern Railway.

In later years, the shuttle train was normally worked by a single car of London Underground G Stock, specially modified for one person operation and fitted with additional brakes. Given the (then highly unusual) driver-only operation, the branch line was equipped with a two wire emergency telephone system at window level, a feature normally found only in tunnels on the London Underground.

Closure
The South Acton to Acton Town shuttle last ran on 28 February 1959 and the spur closed as from 2 March 1959. Nothing now remains of the spur, except for a few bridgeheads and sections of the old trackbed, which indicate the route. Currently the rest of station of the same name continues to be well used.

Branch line to Kew Bridge and Brentford
A 2 km long branch exists to Old Kew Junction near Brentford station on the South Western Railway line from Waterloo which does not carry passenger services. There is also another spur from Kew East Jn to Kew Bridge on the line towards Brentford. This comprised part of the North & South Western Junction Railway.

Services
South Acton currently has the following London Overground (North London Line) services, which is operated by Class 378s:

Off-peak (daily):
4tph to Stratford
4tph to Richmond

References

External links

 Excel file displaying National Rail station usage information for 2005/06
www.sarag.org Local residents association with historical information about South Acton
London's Abandoned Tube Stations – South Acton

District line stations
Disused London Underground stations
Railway stations in the London Borough of Ealing
Former North and South Western Junction Railway stations
Railway stations in Great Britain opened in 1880
Former Metropolitan District Railway stations
Railway stations in Great Britain opened in 1905
Railway stations in Great Britain closed in 1959
Railway stations served by London Overground
Former single platform tube stations
Acton, London